John Seyre (or Feyre) was a pre-Reformation cleric who served as the Bishop of Sodor and Man in the 15th century.

He was appointed bishop of the Diocese of Sodor and Man by papal provision on 10 October 1435 and consecrated on 11 November 1435. It is not known when his episcopate ended, but his successor Thomas Burton was appointed on 25 September 1455.

References 

 
 
 
 
 

15th-century English Roman Catholic bishops
Bishops of Sodor and Man
Year of birth unknown
Year of death unknown